Savage Garden, an Australian pop music duo from 1994–2001, received numerous awards and nominations.

Australian Record Industry Association (ARIA) Awards
These awards have been presented by the Australian Record Industry Association (ARIA) since 1987. Savage Garden has won 14 ARIA Awards from 26 nominations, including winning a record of ten in one year, 1997. Their success has been across categories, being successful twice each in the 'Highest Selling Album' and 'Best Pop Release' categories.

|-
| 1996 || "I Want You" || ARIA Award for Breakthrough Artist – Single ||  
|-
|rowspan="13"| 1997 || rowspan="3"| "To the Moon and Back" || ARIA Award for Best Video (dir. Tony McGrath) || 
|-
| ARIA Award for Best Pop Release ||  
|-
| ARIA Award for Song of the Year ||  
|-
| rowspan="3"|"Truly Madly Deeply" || Song of the Year ||  
|-
| Single of the Year ||  
|-
| ARIA Award for Highest Selling Single ||  
|-
| rowspan="6"| Savage Garden || ARIA Award for Highest Selling Album ||  
|-
| ARIA Award for Best Independent Release || 
|-
| ARIA Award for Breakthrough Artist - Album ||  
|-
| ARIA Award for Producer of the Year ||  
|-
| Engineer of the Year  ||  
|-
| Album of the Year ||  
|-
| Savage Garden || ARIA Award for Best Group ||  
|-
| rowspan="4"| 1998 || Savage Garden || Highest Selling Album ||  
|-
|rowspan="2"| "Universe" || Best Group ||  
|-
| Producer of the Year ||  
|-
| Savage Garden || Outstanding Achievement Award ||  
|-
|rowspan="2"| 1999 ||rowspan="2"|  "The Animal Song"  || Best Pop Release ||  
|-
| Highest Selling Single ||  
|-
|rowspan="5"| 2000 || rowspan="5"|Affirmation|| Album of the Year ||  
|-
| Best Group ||  
|-
| Best Pop Release ||  
|-
| Producer of the Year ||  
|-
| Highest Selling Album ||  
|-
| 2001 || Affirmation|| Highest Selling Album ||  
|-

Australasian Performing Right Association (APRA) Awards
These awards were established by Australasian Performing Right Association (APRA) in 1982 to honour the achievements of songwriters and music composers, and to recognise their song writing skills, sales and airplay performance, by its members annually. Savage Garden has won 10 APRA Awards out of 19 nominations. Six of their wins were for 'Most Performed Australian Work Overseas'.

|-
| rowspan="6"| 1998 || rowspan="2"| "To the Moon and Back" || Song of the Year || 
|-
| Most Performed Australian Work || 
|-
| rowspan="2"| "Truly Madly Deeply" || Song of the Year || 
|-
| Most Performed Australian Work || 
|-
| Darren Hayes, Daniel Jones – Savage Garden || Songwriter of the Year || 
|-
| "I Want You" || Most Performed Australian Work Overseas || 
|-
| 1999 || "Truly Madly Deeply" || Most Performed Australian Work Overseas || 
|-
| rowspan="5"| 2000 || "Truly Madly Deeply" || Most Performed Australian Work Overseas || 
|-
| rowspan="2"|"I Knew I Loved You" || Song of the Year || 
|-
| Most Performed Australian Work || 
|-
| "The Animal Song" || Most Performed Australian Work || 
|-
| Darren Hayes, Daniel Jones – Savage Garden || Songwriter of the Year || 
|-
|rowspan="3"| 2001 || "I Knew I Loved You" || Most Performed Australian Work Overseas || 
|-
|"Affirmation" || Most Performed Australian Work || 
|-
|"Crash and Burn" || Most Performed Australian Work || 
|-
| rowspan="2"| 2002 || "Hold Me" || Most Performed Australian Work || 
|-
| "Crash and Burn" || Most Performed Australian Work Overseas || 
|-
| 2003 || "I Knew I Loved You" || Most Performed Australian Work Overseas || 
|-
| 2005 || "Truly Madly Deeply" || Most Performed Australian Work Overseas ||

ASCAP Pop Awards

|-
| 2001
| rowspan=2|"I Knew I Loved You"
| Song of the Year 
|  
|-
| 2002
| Most Performed Song
|

BRMB Music Radio Awards

|-
| 2000
| Themselves
| Best International Group
|

Billboard Music Awards

 
|-
| rowspan="4"| 1998 
| rowspan="3"| Themselves 
| Top Artist 
| 
|-
| Top Hot 100 Duo/Group 
|  
|-
| Top Hot 100 Artist
| 
|-
| "Truly Madly Deeply"
| Top Hot 100 Song 
|

Brit Awards

 
|-
| 1999
| rowspan="2" | Themselves 
| Best International Breakthrough Act
| 
|-
| 2001
| Best International Group
|

Channel V Awards

 
|-
| 1997
| "I Want You"
| Best International Debut Single 
|

Denmark GAFFA Awards

!Ref.
|-
| 2001
| Themselves
| Best Foreign Live Act
| 
|

ECHO Awards

|-
| 1999
| Themselves
| Best International Group
|

IFPI Platinum Europe Awards

 
|-
| 1998
| Savage Garden
| Album Title 
|

Mo Awards
The Australian Entertainment Mo Awards (commonly known informally as the Mo Awards), were annual Australian entertainment industry awards. They recognise achievements in live entertainment in Australia from 1975 to 2016. Savage Garden won two awards in that time.
 (wins only)
|-
|rowspan="2"| 1999
|rowspan="2"| Tony Pantano
| Australian Showbusiness Ambassador
| 
|-
| Australian Performer of the Year
| 
|-

MTV Europe Music Awards

 
|-
| 1998 
| "Truly Madly Deeply"
| Best Song 
|

Music Television Awards

|-
| rowspan="2" | 1996
| rowspan="3" | Themselves
| Best Breakthrough
| 
|-
| rowspan="2" | Best Pop Act
| 
|-
| rowspan="2" | 1997
| 
|-
| "To the Moon and Back"
| Best Song 
|

MTV Video Music Awards

|-
| 1997
| "To The Moon And Back"
| Viewer's Choice (Australia)
|

Teen Choice Awards

|-
| rowspan="2" | 2000
| Themselves 
| Choice Music: Pop Group
| 
|-
| "I Knew I Loved You"
| Choice Music: Love Song 
|

World Music Awards

 
|-
| 1998
| rowspan=2|Themselves
| rowspan=2|World's Best Selling Australian Artist 
| 
|-
| 2000
|

Notes

References

Awards and nominations
Lists of awards received by Australian musician
Lists of awards received by musical group